"The One You Love" is a song by Paulina Rubio from her sixth album, Border Girl (2002). It was released as the album's second single in North America and Latin America. The song was written by Brett James and Troy Verges, and produced by Sheppard Goodman and Kenny Gioia. A Spanish version titled "Todo Mi Amor" was also included in the album and was released simultaneously with "The One You Love" to Latin America. That version reached the top five of the songs most listened to on the radio in Mexico.

The song received positive reviews from the music media, MTV described the song as "an effervescent pop melody colored with flamenco guitar, is about the fulfillment of satisfying someone else's needs." and it also became one of the most add airplay songs on SKY Radio in Estonia in September 2002 and peaked at number six in the local charts of Paraguay.

Formats and track listings
These are the formats and track listings of major single releases of "The One You Love".
USA CD single
 "The One You Love"

Mexico CD single
 "Todo Mi Amor"
 "The One You Love"

Charts

References

Paulina Rubio songs
2002 singles
Songs written by Brett James
Songs written by Troy Verges
Music videos directed by Wayne Isham
2002 songs
Universal Records singles
English-language Mexican songs